Wassoulou is a genre of West African popular music named for the Wassoulou cultural area.

Wassoulou music is performed mostly by women. Some recurring themes in the lyrics are childbearing, fertility, and polygamy. Instrumentation includes soku (a traditional fiddle sometimes replaced with modern imported instruments), djembe drum, kamalen n'goni (a six-stringed harp), karinyan (metal tube percussion) and bolon (a four-stringed harp). The vocals are often passionate and emphatic, and delivered in a call-and-response pattern.

Prominent Wassoulou artists include Nahawa Doumbia, Oumou Sangaré, Coumba Sidibe, Dienaba Diakite, Kagbe Sidibe, Sali Sidibe, Jah Youssouf, and Fatoumata Diawara.

Notes

References 

Malian music
Women in music